Bidens torta, the corkscrew beggarticks, is a flowering plant species in the family Asteraceae.

Bidens torta is endemic to Hawaii.

Chemical derivatives
Methylated okanin derivatives can be isolated from Bidens torta.

Those include okanin 3,4,3′,4′-tetramethyl ether, okanin 3,4,3′-trimethyl ether 4′-glucoside, okanin 4-methyl ether 4′-glucoside and okanin 4-methyl ether 4′-glucoside monoacetate.

Okanin 3,4-dimethyl ether 4′-glucoside can also be isolated.

References

External links

torta
Endemic flora of Hawaii
Plants described in 1920